Tavira is a town and a municipality in southern Portugal.

Taviara may also refer to:

 Tavira (Santa Maria e Santiago), a civil parish in Tavira, Portugal
 Tavira DOC, a wine region centered around Tavira, Portugal
 Tavira Island, an island south of Tavira, Portugal
 Durango, Biscay, Spain, formerly Tavira

See also
 Tabira (disambiguation)